Felsőmocsolád is a village in Somogy county, Hungary.

Etymology
Its name derives from the world mocsola older version of the Hungarian mocsár. So Felsőmocsolád consists of felső, mocsola and -d suffix.

External links 
 Street map (Hungarian)

References 

Populated places in Somogy County
Hungarian German communities in Somogy County